Burkholder-O'Keefe House is a historic home located at Moberly, Randolph County, Missouri. It was built in 1872, and is a two-story, Italianate style frame I-house.  It features a two-story front porch with gable roof. It is one of the oldest surviving houses in Moberly.

It was listed on the National Register of Historic Places in 1989.

References

Houses on the National Register of Historic Places in Missouri
Italianate architecture in Missouri
Houses completed in 1872
Buildings and structures in Randolph County, Missouri
National Register of Historic Places in Randolph County, Missouri